30 Anos de Chaves (English: 30 Years of El Chavo, Spanish: 30 Años de El Chavo) is a Brazilian TV special celebrating the 30 anniversary of the Mexican TV series El Chavo del Ocho created by Roberto Gómez Bolaños. This special was aired on SBT on August 19, 2011. In opposition to the title, the special marks the 30th anniversary of the broadcaster of the show.

Production
Filming started and wrapped on 12 August 2011 in a replica of the original scenario. Initially, interviewer Marília Gabriela was cast as Mrs. Worthmore, but due to agenda conflicts, she was replaced by actress Lívia Andrade.

Plot
The episode is a remake of the episode Letter Confusion, in which Professor Girafalde arrives in the neighborhood and says to Mrs. Worthmore that had written his feelings for her in a pink paper, but let it fall out of his pocket. Chilindrina founds it later. Coming back home, Mr. Raymond asks Chilindrina to go to the butchery and gives her a white paper with what she needs to buy. She reads the pink paper thinking her father wrote a love letter to the butcher. Unwilling to go, she asks Chavo to go instead of her, saying that her father would give him a ham sandwich. After that, Quico looks for the letter that Professor Girafalde have written to Mrs. Worthmore and Chilindrina gives him the white paper, with the list her father wrote for the butcher.

Cast
 Renê Loureiro as Chavo/Chaves (1st special)
 Alexandre Porpetone as Chavo/Chaves (2nd special)
 Marlei Cevada as Chilindrina/Chiquinha
 Felipe Levoto as Mr. Raymond/Seu Madruga
 Carlos Massa as Mr. Bellarge/Seu Barriga
 Christina Rocha as Mrs. Pinster/Dona Clotilde
 Lívia Andrade as Mrs. Worthmore/Dona Florinda
 Zé Américo as Quico
 Carlos Alberto de Nóbrega as Professor Girafalde/Girafales (1st special)
 Celso Portiolli as Professor Girafalde/Girafales (2nd special)

References

External links
IMDB

Brazilian television specials
2011 television specials